Landusky is an unincorporated community and census-designated place (CDP) in Phillips County, Montana, United States, with a population of 22 per the 2020 census. It is in the southwestern part of the county, in the southwestern part of the Little Rocky Mountains. It sits in the valley of Rock Creek, between Mill Gulch to the northeast and Montana Gulch to the northwest. Ore Street dead-ends in Landusky and leads southwest out of the Little Rockies  to Montana Highway 66.

Landusky was first listed as a CDP prior to the 2020 census.

Demographics

References 

Census-designated places in Phillips County, Montana
Census-designated places in Montana